West Nairobi School (WNS) is a Christian international school in Karen, Nairobi, Kenya using a North American curriculum. It opened in Kilimani, Nairobi in 1996. In 2000 the school moved to its current campus. It serves early childhood through 12th grade.

References

External links

 West Nairobi School

Notable alumni
Seth Newell

Private schools in Kenya
International schools in Nairobi
1996 establishments in Kenya
Educational institutions established in 1996